Hertfordshire Archives and Local Studies (HALS) houses the former Hertfordshire Record Office and the former Hertfordshire Local Studies Library. It collects and preserves archives, other historical documents and printed material relating to the county of Hertfordshire and the Diocese of St Albans from the 11th to the 21st century.
HALS is located in Hertford, in the Register Office Block adjacent to County Hall, Hertford, and run by Hertfordshire County Council.

References

Archives in Hertfordshire
History of Hertfordshire
County record offices in England